Andalgalá is a central department of Catamarca Province in Argentina.

Economy

The main contributors to the economy of Andalgalá Department are farming and mining. The Capillitas Mine is a rich source of Rhodochrosite, (Inca Rosa), as well as 87 other types of mineral, including Catamarcaite, which is named after the Province of Catamarca.

Districts and Settlements

Aconquija
Agua de las Palomas
Agua Verde
Alto de las Juntas
Amanao
Andalgalá
Buena Vista
Campo El Pucará
Chaquiago
Choya
Ciénaga El Pozo
Cóndor Huasi
El Alamito
El Arbolito
El Durazno
El Espinillo
El Lampazo
El Lindero
El Pantanito
El Potrero
Finca Juan J. Gil
La Aguada
La Guadita
La Mesada
Las Palmitas
Las Rosas
Ojo de Agua
Río Potrero
Taco Yacu
Villa Vil

External links
Andalgalá webpage (Spanish)
Capillitas Mine Data

Departments of Catamarca Province
States and territories established in 1822
1822 establishments in Argentina